Fintel is a Samtgemeinde ("collective municipality") in the district of Rotenburg, in Lower Saxony, Germany. Its seat is in the village Lauenbrück.

The Samtgemeinde Fintel consists of the following municipalities:
 Fintel 
 Helvesiek 
 Lauenbrück
 Stemmen 
 Vahlde

Samtgemeinden in Lower Saxony